This table displays the top-rated primetime television series of the 1983–84 season as measured by Nielsen Media Research.

See also 
1983-1984 Season Ratings Standings (All 101 tracked series for the year, listed)

References

1983 in American television
1984 in American television
1983-related lists
1984-related lists
Lists of American television series